Hrádek is a municipality and village in Klatovy District in the Plzeň Region of the Czech Republic. It has about 1,400 inhabitants.

Administrative parts
Villages of Čejkovy, Čermná, Kašovice, Odolenov, Tedražice and Zbynice are administrative parts of Hrádek.

Gallery

References

Villages in Klatovy District
Prácheňsko